Jonathan Singer may refer to:
 Jonathan Singer (politician), Colorado state legislator
 Jonathan Singer (journalist), progressive blogger
 Jonathan M. Singer, podiatrist and photographer
 Jon Singer, Shockwave Radio Theater
 Seymour Jonathan Singer, American cell biologist

See also
John Singer (disambiguation)